Georginapaeus is a genus of gastropods in the family Enidae. It is monotypic, being represented by the single species Georginapaeus hohenackeri.

The species is found in western Asia.

References

Enidae
Monotypic gastropod genera